The 1999 season was the Baltimore Ravens' fourth season in the National Football League (NFL) and the first under head coach Brian Billick. Though they missed the playoffs, they played tough against top division rival Jacksonville and trounced the eventual AFC Champion Titans to help finish the season strong with an 8–8 record.

Offseason

New logo
The Ravens were forced to switch their helmet logo for the 1999 season. Security guard Frederick Bouchat contended that he had created the Ravens’ logo—a “B” inside a winged shield—that had been used from 1996 through 1998. Bouchat sued the team for $10 million, and although he received no damages, a judge upheld a jury's verdict supporting the claim

The team's new logo—the profile of a raven's head with the letter "B"—was voted on by 7,000 fans in a poll by The Baltimore Sun. The updated logo remains in use by the team.

NFL Draft

Staff

Roster

Preseason

Schedule

Regular season

Note: Intra-division opponents are in bold text.

Standings

References

External links
 1999 Baltimore Ravens at Pro-Football-Reference.com

Baltimore Ravens
Baltimore Ravens seasons
Baltimore Ravens
1990s in Baltimore